Nashville School District is an accredited public school district providing comprehensive early childhood, elementary and secondary education to students in and around the rural, distant Howard County community of Nashville, Arkansas, United States.

In 1966 the Childress School District merged into the Nashville School District.

The district extends into Hempstead County, and into Pike County.

Schools 
 Nashville High School—provides secondary education in grades 10 through 12.
 Nashville Junior High School—provides secondary education in grades 7 through 9.
 Nashville Primary School—provides elementary education in grades 4 through 6.
 Nashville Primary School—provides elementary education in prekindergarten through grade 3.

References

Further reading
 (Download)

External links 
 

School districts in Arkansas
Education in Howard County, Arkansas
Education in Hempstead County, Arkansas
Education in Pike County, Arkansas
1907 establishments in Arkansas
School districts established in 1907